Hugo Armando Sifuentes Hernández (born 3 July 1993 in Ciudad Madero, Tamaulipas) is a Mexican professional footballer who plays for Tampico Madero F.C.

References

External links
 
 

Living people
1993 births
Mexican footballers
Association football forwards
Altamira F.C. players
Atlas F.C. footballers
C.D. Tepatitlán de Morelos players
Ascenso MX players
Liga Premier de México players
Tercera División de México players
Footballers from Tamaulipas
People from Ciudad Madero